Alfred Searcy (4 January 1854 – 1 October 1925) was a South Australian public servant and writer. He was based in Darwin from 1882 to 1896 and was a booster for development of northern Australia during and after his time there.

Family and education
He was the son of William Searcy, clerk and policeman, and his wife Charlotte Edwin, née Roffe, and brother of Arthur Searcy who also had a distinguished career as a South Australian public servant. His parents, and uncle Frederick Searcy, had arrived at Port Adelaide on 3 September 1849, on the ship Louisa Baillie.

He attended Dumas' school, Mount Barker, later Pulteney Street School, Adelaide, until 1869.

On 10 February 1876, he married Jane Annette Rainsford, daughter of Joseph Rainsford and Jane née Brown at Holy Trinity Church, Adelaide.

Alfred Searcy died on 1 October 1925 in Adelaide and was buried in North Road Cemetery.

Career
In 1869, he was indentured as a journalist with The Advertiser, joining the customs department in 1873. In the period before 1882, he received the certificate of the Royal Humane Society, London, for saving a woman from drowning and became a captain in the Port Adelaide Rifle Company.

From 1882 he was sub-collector of customs in Darwin, Northern Territory and implemented new customs arrangements generally and licensing and duty arrangements for Macassan trepangers. He was promoted in 1888, however for health reasons his wife and children returned to Adelaide in 1890. He joined Paul Foelsche and Edward Robinson on several voyages.

He remained in Darwin until 1896, when he became clerk assistant and sergeant-at-arms in the South Australian House of Assembly, a position previously held by his brother, Arthur. He became Clerk of the House in 1918 and Clerk of the parliaments in 1920.

Writer
In Northern Seas, published in 1905 collected newspaper articles about his period in the Northern Territory. He reworked and extended the material as In Australian Tropics, published in 1907, with By Flood and Field, published in 1911, being a fictionalised account of the earlier books.

See also

References 

History of South Australia
History of the Northern Territory
1854 births
1925 deaths
Public servants of South Australia
Customs officers
People from Darwin, Northern Territory
Australian male writers
Burials at North Road Cemetery